Pauahi Crater is a volcanic crater measuring  long, up to some  across, and  deep in Hawaii Volcanoes National Park at .

Eruptive history
Three historic eruptions have occurred at or near Pauahi Crater. The first was in May 1973 when a fissure opened and erupted briefly on its floor. 
The second took place in November 1973 and lasted 31 days (November 10 — December 9), but most activity was concentrated during the event's initial 10 hours. The third eruption occurred on November 16, 1979, and lasted only one day.

References

External links

 General description of Pauahi Crater

Kīlauea
1973 in the United States
Hawaiʻi Volcanoes National Park
Volcanic craters